The Artist 100 is a chart published weekly by Billboard in the United States. The Billboard Artist 100 combines performance across the Hot 100 chart, the Billboard 200 album chart, and the Internet-centric Social 50 chart.

The Artist 100 chart premiered in the issue dated July 19, 2014, with Trey Songz ranked number one. Taylor Swift ranks as the artist with the most weeks atop the chart.

Artists with most weeks at number one

References

External links 
 Current chart

Billboard charts